Aled Davies (born 19 July 1992) is a Welsh rugby union player who plays at scrum-half for Saracens.

Davies, a scrum half, was born in Carmarthen, and was a member of the age grade set up in the Scarlets region for a number of seasons; playing in the Reebok Regional Championship final with the Scarlets U18 during the 2008–09 season. He then made his debut for the Scarlets in a friendly against Worcester Warriors, coming off the bench in the 43–14 win. His competitive debut came a season later in the Anglo-Welsh Cup, where Davies made a substitute appearance in a 31–3 victory over Leicester Tigers. Davies left the Scarlets at the end of the 2017–18 season, moving to their local rivals, the Ospreys. In May 2020 it was announced he had signed a three-year deal to join English side Saracens from the 2020–21 season.

Davies played for Wales U18 in the 2009 U18 Six Nations Championship, Davies made his under-18 debut against France in a 27–15 victory, scoring a try.

In May 2013 he was selected in the Wales national rugby union team 32 man training squad for the summer 2013 tour to Japan. In January 2016 he was called up to the senior squad again for the 2016 Six Nations Championship. In May 2017 he was named in the Wales senior squad for the tests against Tonga and Samoa in June 2017.

International tries

References

External links
 

1992 births
Living people
Welsh rugby union players
Wales international rugby union players
Rugby union scrum-halves
Scarlets players
Ospreys (rugby union) players
Rugby union players from Carmarthenshire
Saracens F.C. players